The 1900 Building is a historic U.S. building located at 1900 South Harbor City Boulevard, Melbourne, Florida.  This three story building was constructed in 1924 and originally opened as the Melbourne Hotel.  The building housed several businesses through the years, including a bank, specialty stores and professional offices.  The building has seen significant architectural changes over the years, with the reconstruction of the corner tower, elimination of the original windows, reconstruction of the covered walkways, and elimination of the dome atop the tower. The building received its current name from its address -- "1900" South Harbour City Boulevard.

Notes

External links

1900 Building (official website)
 (Historic Photograph)

Hotel buildings completed in 1924
Buildings and structures in Melbourne, Florida
Commercial buildings in Florida
1924 establishments in Florida